19th National Board of Review Awards
December 19, 1947
The 19th National Board of Review Awards were announced on December 19, 1947.

Best English Language Films 
Monsieur Verdoux
Great Expectations
Shoeshine
Crossfire
Boomerang!
Odd Man Out
Gentleman's Agreement
To Live in Peace
It's a Wonderful Life
The Overlanders

Winners 
 Best Film: Monsieur Verdoux
 Best Actor: Michael Redgrave (Mourning Becomes Electra)
 Best Actress: Celia Johnson (This Happy Breed)
 Best Director: Elia Kazan (Boomerang! and Gentleman's Agreement)

External links 
National Board of Review of Motion Pictures :: Awards for 1947

1947
1947 film awards
1947 in American cinema